Carbery or Carbury may refer to:

People
 Brian Carbury (1918–1961), New Zealand fighter ace
 Douglas Carbery (1894–1959), British soldier and airman
 Ethna Carbery (1864–1902), Irish writer
 James Joseph Carbery (1823–1887), Irish Dominican, Bishop of Hamilton, Canada
 Joe Carbury (1926–2017) Canadian rodeo announcer
 Joey Carbery (born 1995), Irish rugby union player
 Mary Carbery (1867-1949), English author
 Spencer Carbery (born 1981), Canadian ice hockey player
 Thomas Carbery (1791–1863), mayor of Washington, D.C.

Places
 Carbery (barony), former barony in County Cork, Ireland; location of:—
 Carbery East, barony
 Carbery West, barony
 Carbery's Hundred Isles, archipelago
 Ross Carbery, town
 Carbury (County Kildare barony), location of:—
 Carbury, County Kildare, village
 Carbury Castle, County Kildare
 Carbury, County Sligo, barony
 Carbury, North Dakota, USA, unincorporated community in Bottineau County

Titles
 Baron Carbery, title in the Peerage of Ireland
 Earl of Carbery, title in the Peerage of Ireland
 Princes of Carbery, Gaelic title of the MacCarthy Reagh

Sports
 Carbery GAA, County Cork Gaelic games division
 Carbery Rangers GAA, in Ross Carbery, County Cork
 Carbury GAA, club in County Kildare

See also
 Carberry (disambiguation), similar spelling
 Cairbre (disambiguation), Irish-language equivalent